Kutubdia Gas Field is a natural gas field located in the Bay of Bengal of Cox's Bazar, Bangladesh. It is controlled by Bangladesh Petroleum Exploration and Production Company Limited (BAPEX).

Production
It is a miniature gas field as estimated. According to calculations, the total gas reserves in this gas field is 780 billion cubic feet (BCF). No gas is currently being extracted from this gas field; because of the scarcity of its stock, it has not been brought into production.

See also 

List of natural gas fields in Bangladesh
Bangladesh Gas Fields Company Limited
Gas Transmission Company Limited

References 

1977 establishments in Bangladesh
Natural gas fields in Bangladesh